Aaadonta constricta constricta is a subspecies of land snail, a terrestrial pulmonate gastropod mollusk in the family Endodontidae. 

It is considered an alternate representation of Aaadonta constricta (Semper, 1874)

It is endemic to Palau. It is threatened by destruction or modification of its habitat.

References

Endodontidae
Endemic fauna of Palau
Gastropods described in 1874